Cape Eluanbi or Oluanpi, also known by other names, is the southernmost point on the island of Taiwan. It is located in  within the Hengchun Township in Pingtung County.

Names
Éluánbí is the pinyin romanization of the Mandarin pronunciation of its Chinese name  These characters literally mean "Goose Bell Nose", but actually transcribe the local Hokkien pronunciation Gô-lôan, used as a transliteration of the Paiwan  ("sail"). This may be a reference to nearby Sail Rock. The "nose" in the name is a dialectical term for a cape, as in nearby Cape Maobitou.

Under the Qing, it was sometimes known as "Linhaishan".

Geography
Eluanbi is the southernmost point of the Hengchun Peninsula, making it the southernmost point on Formosa or Taiwan Island. The nearby highlands are considered an extension of Taiwan's Central Mountain Range.

Current international agreement places the boundary between the East and South China Seas at Cape Fugui, Taiwan's northernmost point, but Eluanbistill under its Japanese name forms part of the boundary between the East China and Philippine Seas. The still-unapproved draft for a new edition of the IHO's Limits of Oceans and Seas makes  part of the northern boundary of the South China Sea the southern boundary of the Taiwan Strait, and part of the western border of the Philippine Sea.

Informally, Eluanbi may also be considered part of the Luzon Strait and Bashi Channel between the territory of Taiwan and the Philippines.

History

Prehistory
Archaeologists have found evidence of prehistoric habitation at Eluanbi dating to around 3100BC. The remains are similar to those of the Xiantao culture found on the islands of Taitung County but known locally as "Oluanpi-I". Pottery and weaving began to appear under the "Kenting" around 2500BC. Around 1500BC, the "Oluanpi-III" curtailed lowland farming and retreated to more defensive communities in the highlands; it developed into the "Oluanpi-IV" around 50BC. About the same time, the separate Hsiang-lin culture settled in the area's river valleys and lowlands; the Kueishan culture followed them around the 2nd century and the Ami around the 5th. By that point, hunting had become a ritual act and pastime for its well-developed farming communities, rather than a means of survival. The Paiwan eventually replaced the local people in the highlands, expanding from the north. The Siraya, from a legendary origin on Xiaoliuqiu, settled into the area's lowlands from the 8th century and were the first to greatly sinify themselves.

Qing Empire
Under the early Qing, the area around the cape continued to be held by Taiwanese aborigines such as the Paiwan. The cape's strong currents and nearby Qixingyan reefs produced numerous shipwrecks, provoking international incidents in the case of the Rover in 1867 and a Ryukyu convoy in 1871 that led to American and Japanese invasions of the island.

The American consul at Xiamen (then known as "Amoy") Charles Le Gendre advised the Viceroy of Liangjiang Shen Baozhen of the risk to Chinese control of Taiwan posed by its official disavowal of control over native-held lands on the island. Shen reformed the civil and military administrations on Taiwan, launched assaults against restive tribes, and began a public works program on the southern coast including a lighthouse at Eluanbi. Construction of the lighthouse fell under the purview of the British diplomat Robert Hart, who served as inspector general of the Imperial Maritime Customs Service. This gesture did not keep the Paiwan and other tribes from raids and assaults against the Chinese construction projects, which necessitated garrisoning and fortifying Eluanbi. The lighthouse itself was finally raised between 1881 and 1883, entering service on  1883.

The lighthouse, its staff, and its garrison were initially overseen by British customs officers and German military officers. The site was protected by 18-pound cannons, Gatling guns, and a mortar. Provisions were kept for three weeks in the event of a siege.

Imperial Japan
The Qing structure was heavily damaged during the First Sino-Japanese War, with the retreating Qing attempting to demolish it themselves. It was repaired in 1898 following the Japanese occupation of the island. It was under Japanese occupation that the cape was recognized as the southernmost point on the island, and the lighthouse was popularized by the Japanese as one of the Eight Views of Taiwan.

The cape was a major station for the Japanese whaling industry, targeting humpback whales in Banana and South Bays. The site's importance to the whaling industry was underscored by the design of its Shinto shrine, one of only five in the world to use baleen whales' jawbones to form their torii gates.

The fortified lighthouse was seriously damaged again during World War II by Allied bombing; the shrine was destroyed at the same time.

Republic of China
The Nationalist government rebuilt the lighthouse in 1947. The accidental exposure of several stone coffins near the lighthouse in 1956 prompted investigation of the area by the archaeologists Sung Wen-tung and Lin Chao-chi that year and again in 1966. The lighthouse grounds were turned into a national park in 1982. During the construction of paths and walkways prior to its opening, further prehistoric relics were found in 1981 and excavated over the next two years by teams under Li Kuang-chou.

In 1992 Eluanbi Lighthouse was among the first lighthouses on Taiwan to be opened to the general public, and its popularity motivated the Maritime and Port Bureau to open others elsewhere. By 2014, it was receiving more than 300,000 visitors a year, many of them tourists from Mainland China.

Park

The cape is located within the   part of the larger Kenting National Park that covers the southern end of the Hengchun Peninsula.

A viewing platform with a rock marker at the island's southernmost point has become a tourist attraction.

Located around Banana Bay, Longkeng preserves coral reefs and an old-growth forest. The seas around Eluanbi are no longer home to any native whales, but it remains abundantly stocked with smaller cetaceans such as dolphins, with sea turtles, and bull sharks. In particular, the 26 species of terrestrial crabs that inhabit the cape make it the most biologically diverse location for land crabs in the world.

See also
 Geography of Taiwan
 Cape Fugui, the northernmost point on Taiwan
 Geographic Center of Taiwan
 List of countries by southernmost point
 List of Taiwanese superlatives

References

Citations

Bibliography

 .
 . 
 .
 .
 .
 . 
 .
 .
 . 
 .

Eluanbi
Landforms of Pingtung County
Extreme points of Earth